The Airfer Titan is a family of Spanish paramotors that was designed and produced by Airfer of Pontevedra for powered paragliding. Now out of production, when the line was available the aircraft were supplied complete and ready-to-fly.

Design and development
The Titan was designed to comply with the US FAR 103 Ultralight Vehicles rules as well as European regulations. It features a paraglider-style wing, single-place accommodation and a single Falcon  engine in pusher configuration with a 2.2:1 or 3.42:1 ratio reduction drive and a  diameter two-bladed composite propeller. The aircraft is built from a combination of aluminium tubing, with a titanium chassis.

As is the case with all paramotors, take-off and landing is accomplished by foot. Inflight steering is accomplished via handles that actuate the canopy brakes, creating roll and yaw.

Variants
Titan 110
Model powered by a  Falcon engine with a 2.2:1 ratio reduction drive and a  diameter two-bladed composite propeller.
Titan 120
Model powered by a  Falcon engine with a 3.42:1 ratio reduction drive and a  diameter two-bladed composite propeller.

Specifications (Titan 110)

References

Titan
2000s Spanish ultralight aircraft
Single-engined pusher aircraft
Paramotors